Stanislav Chadovich (born 24 August 1992 in Mahilyow) is a male weightlifter representing Belarus.

Career
Chadovich won a silver at the 2014 European Weightlifting Championships for the 62kg event. In 2016, he testing positive for urine manipulation and subsequently suspended after the adverse analytical finding.

References

External links
 

1992 births
Living people
Belarusian male weightlifters
European Weightlifting Championships medalists
People from Mogilev
Sportspeople from Mogilev Region
21st-century Belarusian people